The Leader of the Opposition of Punjab (Urdu: قائد حزب اختلاف پنجاب), is an elected politician who is, by Pakistani law, the leader of the Official Opposition in the Province of Punjab. The Leader of the Opposition leads the Opposition in the Provincial Assembly of Punjab. The Leader of the Opposition is the leader of the largest political party in the Provincial Assembly that is not in government. This is usually the leader of the second-largest political party in the Provincial Assembly.

Former Leaders of the Opposition Punjab

Before independence (1937-1947)

After Independence

See also
Provincial Assembly of Punjab
Governor of Punjab
Chief Minister of Punjab
Senior Minister of Punjab (Pakistan)
Speaker of the Provincial Assembly of Punjab
Chief Secretary Punjab

References

 
 
 
 
 
 
 
 
 
 
 
 
 
 
 
 
 

Politicians from Punjab, Pakistan
Provincial Assembly of the Punjab
Punjab